Parapelophryne is a monotypic genus of toads in the family Bufonidae. The only species is Parapelophryne scalpta. It is endemic to Hainan, China.

Males call near small streams, the probable breeding habitat of this species. It is threatened by habitat loss caused by smallholder farming activities and small-scale wood extraction. Its range overlaps with some protected areas.

References

Bufonidae
Monotypic amphibian genera
Amphibians of Asia
Frogs of China
Endemic fauna of Hainan
Taxonomy articles created by Polbot